The third season of Canada's Got Talent, is an upcoming reality television series. The season will premiere on March 21, 2023.

Production 
On September 14, 2022, Canada's Got Talent confirmed filming a new season, with Lindsay Ell hosting the show, and the same judges from the previous season. It was also announced that the auditions will be filmed in a bigger venue from the last season, at the OLG Stage in the Niagara Fallsview Casino Resort. The auditions started on October 19, and concluded on October 23. All shows were reportedly sold-out.

Footnotes

References 

2023 Canadian television seasons
3
Upcoming television seasons